1st Marine Brigade may refer to:

 1st Marine Brigade (Iran), a Takavar unit of the Islamic Republic of Iran Navy
 1st Provisional Marine Brigade, a United States Marine Corps ad hoc infantry brigade in service from 1912 to 1950
 1st Marine Division, formerly known as the 1st Advance Base Brigade, 1913–1933
1st Marine Expeditionary Brigade (United States), a permanent United States Marine Corps crisis response expeditionary brigade formerly known as the 1st Marine Brigade (1956-1985) and as the 1st Marine Amphibious Brigade (1985-1988)